The 8th African Swimming Championships were held in Dakar, Senegal from September 11 to September 16, 2006.

Medal table

Medal summary

Men's events 

|-
|50 m freestyle

|-
|100 m freestyle

|-
|200 m freestyle

|-
|400 m freestyle

|-
|800 m freestyle

|-
|1500 m freestyle

|-
|50 m breaststroke

|-
|100 m breaststroke

|-
|200 m breaststroke

|-
|50 m butterfly

|-
|100 m butterfly

|-
|200 m butterfly

|-
|50 m backstroke

|-
|100 m backstroke

|-
|200 m backstroke

|-
|200 m individual medley

|-
|400 m individual medley

|-
|4 x 100 m freestyle relay

|-
|4 x 200 m freestyle relay

|-
|4 x 100 m medley relay

Women's events 

|-
|50 m freestyle

|-
|100 m freestyle

|-
|200 m freestyle

|-
|400 m freestyle

|-
|800 m freestyle

|-
|1500 m freestyle

|-bgcolor=#DDDDDD
|colspan=7|
|-
|50 m breaststroke

|-
|100 m breaststroke

|-
|200 m breaststroke

|-bgcolor=#DDDDDD
|colspan=7|
|-
|50 m butterfly

|-
|100 m butterfly

|-
|200 m butterfly

|-bgcolor=#DDDDDD
|colspan=7|
|-
|50 m backstroke

|-
|100 m backstroke

|-
|200 m backstroke

|-bgcolor=#DDDDDD
|colspan=7|
|-
|200 m individual medley

|-
|400 m individual medley

|-bgcolor=#DDDDDD
|colspan=7|
|-
|4 x 100 m freestyle relay

|-
|4 x 200 m freestyle relay

|-
|4 x 100 m medley relay

External links 
8th African Swimming Championships
Full results

African Swimming Championships
African Swimming Championships, 2006
African Swimming Championships, 2006
Swim
International sports competitions hosted by Senegal
Sports competitions in Dakar
Swimming in Senegal